The ninth cycle of Britain & Ireland's Next Top Model premiered on 20 June 2013 on Sky Living. Two judges from the previous cycle did not retain their positions. Elle Macpherson continued as the show's head judge along with model Tyson Beckford, but fashion designer Julien Macdonald and Whitney Port left the series. Australian singer and talent show judge Dannii Minogue joined the series as a third judge.

A new format was introduced at judging beginning with this cycle. Guest judges were no longer a deciding factor during eliminations. At panel, the judges went straight into deliberation without evaluating each contestant individually. Furthermore, there were multiple contestants in danger of elimination each week as opposed to the usual two in seasons past. Only the contestants in danger of elimination received in-depth critique and feedback on ways to improve their performance.

Cycle 9 auditions began on November 2012. The show saw a record number of auditions held in over 17 cities ranging from Plymouth to Glasgow. Filming for the show's ninth cycle began on 21 January 2013

The prizes for this cycle included a modelling contract with Models 1, a fashion spread and cover feature in Company magazine, contracts with Revlon cosmetics and TRESemmé, and an all-expenses paid shopping spree to New York City, courtesy of Destinology.

The winner of the competition was 23-year-old Lauren Lambert from Wallington, Surrey.

Cast

Contestants
(Ages stated are at start of contest)

Judges
Elle Macpherson (host)
Tyson Beckford
Dannii Minogue

Episodes

Results

 The contestant was eliminated
 The contestant won the competition

Bottom two

 The contestant was eliminated after her first time in the bottom two
 The contestant was eliminated after her second time in the bottom two
 The contestant was eliminated after her third time in the bottom two
 The contestant was eliminated in the final judging and placed as the runner-up

Average  call-out order
Final two is not included.

Notes

References

External links 
Official website

09
2013 British television seasons
Television shows filmed in England
Television shows filmed in Barbados